List of Finnish women bandy champions. The first women's championships in bandy were only played in 1979. No women's championships were played 1993–2005.

Winners through the years 
 1979 Veitsiluodon Vastus
 1980 Veitsiluodon Vastus
 1981 Lauttasaaren Pyrintö
 1982 Oulun Luistinseura
 1983 Oulun Luistinseura
 1984 Lauttasaaren Pyrintö
 1985 Jyväskylän Seudun Palloseura
 1986 IFK Helsingfors
 1987 IFK Helsingfors
 1988 Oulun Luistinseura
 1989 Jyväskylän Seudun Palloseura
 1990 Jyväskylän Seudun Palloseura
 1991 Jyväskylän Seudun Palloseura
 1992 Jyväskylän Seudun Palloseura
 1993–2005 no women's championships
 2006 Botnia-69, Helsinki
 2007 Botnia-69, Helsinki
 2008 Botnia-69, Helsinki
 2009 Botnia-69, Helsinki
 2010 Tornion Palloveikot
 2011 IFK Helsingfors, Helsinki
 2012 Veiterä, Lappeenranta
 2013 Veitsiluodon Vastus
 2014 Sudet, Kouvola
 2015 Sudet, Kouvola
 2016 Sudet, Kouvola
 2017 Sudet, Kouvola
 2018 Sudet, Kouvola
 2019 Sudet, Kouvola

Titles

Women's titles per club
 6: Sudet
 5: Jyväskylän Seudun Palloseura
 4: Botnia-69
 3: Oulun Luistinseura
 3: IFK Helsingfors
 3: Veitsiluodon Vastus
 2: Lautasaaren Pyrintö
 1: Tornion Palloveikot
 1: Lappeenrannan Veiterä

Men's and women's titles the same year

Sources

See also
 List of Finnish bandy champions

Bandy in Finland
Finland women
Bandy